Peter Wallace Brannen Alward (born 1964) is a Canadian philosopher. He is a Professor in Philosophy and the Department Head in Philosophy at the University of Saskatchewan. He is known for his works on philosophy of fiction, philosophy of art and environmental philosophy.
In 2016 Alward was awarded Tenured Professor Essay Prize by The Canadian Philosophical Association.

Books
Philosophical Problems: an introductory text in philosophy, Broadview, 2017.
Empty Revelations: an essay on talk about, and attitudes toward, fiction, McGill-Queen's University Press, 2012.

References

External links
Personal website
Peter Alward at the University of Saskatchewan
Peter Alward, Google Scholar

1964 births
20th-century Canadian male writers
20th-century Canadian philosophers
20th-century essayists
21st-century Canadian male writers
21st-century Canadian philosophers
21st-century essayists
Analytic philosophers
Canadian philosophers
Environmental philosophers
Environmental writers
Literary theorists
Living people
Philosophers of art
Philosophers of literature
Philosophy academics
Philosophy writers
University of North Carolina at Chapel Hill alumni
Academic staff of the University of Saskatchewan